Season to Risk are an American noise rock/alternative rock band hailing from Kansas City, Missouri, United States.

History
Season to Risk formed in late 1989 from the ashes of the Kansas City, Missouri punk bands Nine Lives and Curious George, who played together at the legendary Outhouse, a Kansas hardcore venue. Although Season to Risk have had several line-up changes, two founding members have remained constant: Steve Tulipana (lead vocals, guitar) and Duane Trower (lead guitar, keyboards, and vocals). Drummer David Silver joined the band in 1994. Billy Smith (bass) and Wade Williamson (rhythm guitar and keyboards) joined in 1999, both coming from the band Dirtnap. 

Founding bass player Paul Malinowski played from 1989 - 1995, until he left to join the Kansas City band Shiner. He was replaced on bass in 1995 by Josh Newton, who also plays guitar in Shiner.

The band's genre-bending sound has been defined as post-rock, post-hardcore, math rock, and indie rock. Their constantly changing music has challenged audiences, and the record labels they have worked with, with one CMJ reviewer calling it "metal for recovering indie rockers".

Season to Risk released The Shattering (2001) on Owned and Operated, produced by Bill Stevenson and Jason Livermore. Other releases include Men Are Monkeys, Robots Win (1998) on Thick Records, and In A Perfect World (1995), with a cover designed by Derek Hess. The self-titled debut Season To Risk (1993) features the underground hits "Snakes" and "Mine Eyes", with a cover designed by Frank Kozik. Both Hess and Kozik produced limited-edition silkscreen posters of the covers.

The band were signed to Columbia Records / Sony, who released their first two albums, during the early 90s post-Nirvana alternative rock frenzy. They performed in the nightclub scene in the 1994 film Strange Days, living in a trailer on set in Hollywood for a week.

Season to Risk toured constantly through the 90s, and have toured or played shows with Jesus Lizard, Barkmarket, Prong, Unsane, No Means No, Corrosion of Conformity, Monster Magnet, Fudge Tunnel, Pain Teens, Melvins, Cheer Accident, Babes In Toyland, Quicksand, Fugazi, Helmet, Archers of Loaf, Polvo, Jawbox, Neurosis, the Get Up Kids, Dirtnap, Hammerhead, Coalesce, Reggie and the Full Effect, Libido Boys, CRAW, Descendents, ALL, 7 Year Bitch, Plexi, 90 Day Men, Idiot Flesh, Sleepytime Gorilla Museum, Toadies, Calvin Crime, Today Is the Day, Glazed Baby, Uz Jsme Doma, House of large Sizes, Shiner, Molly McGuire, Skinyard, Stinking Lizaveda, The Spitters, Boy's Life, Quitter's Club, Giant's Chair, Keelhaul, Janis Figure, SHIV, Cows, Nashville Pussy, Sheilbound, Collossamite, Dazzling Killmen, Buzzoven, Killdozer, Slow Roosevelt, Caulk, Scrid, Blue Meanies, Zen Guerilla, Arab On Radar, 5 Deadly Venoms, Pave The Rocket, Fragile Porcelain Mice, Nebula, Players Club, Beaver, Tribe 8, the Feds, Grotus, Sweet a Pea, many series, Astoveboat, Houston, The Farewell Bend, Guzzard, The String and Return, Pellum 123, Karma To Burn, Ravine, Tanger, Hum, Someday I, Gut, Hickey, Esoteric, Be/Non, anvil chorus, and others.

The master tapes for the band's first two albums were destroyed in the 2008 Universal Studios fire, along with an estimated 150,000 other master tapes. 

Still based in Kansas City, the band tours occasionally and plays regionally, including shows with No Means No (2006), Helmet (2009), Iron Rite Mangle / Moly McGuire (2012), the Medicine Theory (2016), Descendents (2017, 2021), Cheer Accident (2022). Singer Steve Tulipana is the owner/operator of two venues in KCMO, the RecordBar and MiniBar.
 
In 2018, Season to Risk began self-releasing a remaster series on Bandcamp and toured, playing SxSW South By Southwest and Valley of the Vapors fest, sharing the stage with their alter ego band Sie Lieben Maschinen. In 2019, the band toured the midwest, playing shows at Riot Fest and with Porcupine at 7th St Entry in MN, supporting a new vinyl release of the album ”The Shattering”, remastered for vinyl by Jason Livermore at Blasting Room studio, Ft. Collins, CO, on limited-edition orange vinyl.

In 2020, Season to Risk released their seminal 1998 album ”Men Are Monkeys. Robots Win.“ remastered by Duane Trower at Weights and Measures Soundlab, KCMO, on limited-edition green vinyl, but a 2020 tour was postponed due to the Covid-19 pandemic. Their website stated: "Ironically, mentions of the album title are often incorrectly flagged as hate speech by the algorithm on many platforms. Robot wins."

The band released a collection of singles, B-sides and covers in 2022 titled "1-800-MELTDOWN" and played several shows with Chicago's Cheer Accident. Season to Risk began recording new music with Duane Trower at his studio Weights and Measures Soundlab in 2022. Trower has produced albums for Radkey, Giants Chair and many others.

Members
Steve Tulipana - Vocals, guitar, synthesizer (1989-present)
Duane Trower - Guitar, backup vocals, synthesizer, engineering (1989-present)
David Silver - Drums, synth oscillator, metal (1994-present)
Billy Smith - Bass, backup vocals, guitar, synthesizer (1999-present)
Wade Williamson - Guitar, synths, keyboard (1999-present)

Former members
Paul Malinowski - Bass (1989-1995)
Josh Newton - Bass (1995-1998)
Jason Gerken - Drums on "Perfect World" (1994)
Tim Dow - Drums (1990, 1992, 1994)
Chris Metcalf - Drums (live 2003-2009)
Chad Sabin - Drums (live 1992-1994)
Peter Murray - Drums on "eponymous"(1991-1992)
Chris Sharp - Bass (live 1999)
Loren Chambers - Drums (early demos)
Frank Garymartin - Drums (live 1994)
Mike Myers - Drums (live 2002)
Jerry Bayton - Drums (live 1990)

Discography

Studio albums
Season to Risk (Columbia Records, 1992)
In a Perfect World (Columbia Records, 1994)
Men are Monkeys, Robots Win (Thick Records, 1998)
The Shattering (Owned & Operated Records, 2001)

Singles and EPs
Mine Eyes/Snakes (Red Decibel/Columbia Records, 1992)
Biter/Oil (Red Decibel/Columbia Records, 1992)
Undone (AFFA Records, 1996)
Beestings and Poison Eggs /w Starkweather(Supermodel Records, 1998)
Ace of Space (-ismist Recordings, 1999)

References

External links
The Official Season to Risk website
Season to Risk Bandcamp
Season to Risk YouTube channel
Season to Risk posters

American punk rock groups
Electronic music groups from Missouri
Musical groups from Kansas City, Missouri